Ghazi Nara is a scenic and tourist hillside settlement near Jhelum City in the Punjab province of Pakistan approximately 15 km from Dina and 10 km from Khukha.

Clearly visible from the Grand Trunk Road and across from the Taraki railway station, Ghazu Nara is the site of a natural spring and the main drinking water source for the surrounding residents.

The area is also a popular religious site as the nearby darbar is reputed to answer prayers from couples having difficulties conceiving children.

Gallery 

Populated places in Jhelum District